Shem Tov Levi (Hebrew: שם טוב לוי, born 4 February 1950) is an Israeli singer, pianist, flautist and composer. He was a member of the famous Israeli group Ktzat Acheret.

During his long career, Levy has released solo albums, alongside working with many musicians, including Arik Einstein, Esther Ofarim, Yehudit Ravitz, Rivka Zohar, Arik Sinai, Yitzhak Klepter, Gidi Gov, Ofra Haza, Dikla, Shlomo Gronich.

Biography
He studied at Tel Aviv University and Berklee College of Music in Boston.
He started his professional career as a composer, after having written two songs which appeared on Arik Einstein's 1972 album "Jasmine". Later they had collaborative albums together.
In the 70s he was a member of the rock groups קצת אחרת (Ktzat Acheret, Hebrew for "A Little Different") and Sheshet.

He has recorded a lot of solo and collaborative albums spanning pop, rock, folk and jazz, as well as leading his own jazz and folk ensemble.

References

External links
Shem-Tov Levi at Israel-music.com

1950 births
Living people
Israeli composers
Israeli flautists
Israeli pianists
21st-century pianists
21st-century flautists